Andrew Michael Colman (born 8 January 1944 in Johannesburg, South Africa) is a British psychologist and Professor of Psychology at the University of Leicester. He is known for his research on decision making and game theory. He has been a fellow of the British Psychological Society since 1984, and a fellow of the Higher Education Academy since 2016.

He complaeted a BA and MA in Psychology at the University of Cape Town, where he also particpiated in the sit-in during the Mafeje affair in 1968.

References

External links
Colman's faculty page
Colman's page at Social Psychology Network

Living people
1944 births
Rhodes University alumni
Academics of the University of Leicester
People from Johannesburg
South African emigrants to the United Kingdom
British psychologists
Fellows of the British Psychological Society